Francisco Hernández de Córdoba may refer to:

 Francisco Hernández de Córdoba (Yucatán conquistador) (died 1517)
 Francisco Hernández de Córdoba (founder of Nicaragua) (died 1526)